Irada Azad gizi Aliyeva – Azerbaijani athlete-paralimpic, appearing in the category F12 blindness. World Cup winner among Paralympians 2015. Irada represented Azerbaijan at the 2016 Summer Paralympic Games in Rio de Janeiro, which won the silver medal.

Biography
Irada Aliyeva was born 27 December 1991 in Baku in a family of athletes. So, Aliyeva's mother was engaged in cycling and motorcycling, and grandmother – acrobatics. Initially, Irada wanted to be professionally engaged in volleyball, but could not due to a small increase, preferring javelin throw. According to the most Aliyeva, javelin throw is a complex discipline, and she likes to "take up the challenges". Irada graduated from high school number 310 and the Academy of Physical Education and Sports in Baku.
Aliyev began performing in 2005. In 2009, she decided to take a break from the sport, but in 2014 returned to the sport. In 2015 she took part in the first European Games in Baku in healthy javelin throw. At this tournament Aliyeva with the result of 36.99 m took the 10th place. In the same year she won the Grand Prix championship in Tunisia and Baku javelin.
In October 2015 at the World Championships in Doha, Qatar Irada Aliyeva won the gold medal in the javelin, setting a new world record (44.18 m) and also became the owner of the permit for the 2016 Summer Paralympic Games in Rio de Janeiro. At the Paralympic Games Aliyeva in the F12 / 13 category in the best attempt has thrown a spear on 42.58 meters and finished second. In September 2016 Aliyeva decree of President of Azerbaijan Ilham Aliyev for high achievements at the 2016 Summer Paralympic Games in Rio de Janeiro, as well as for merits in development of the Azerbaijani sport was awarded the Order "For Service to the Fatherland" III degree.

References

External links
 

Living people
Paralympic athletes of Azerbaijan
Paralympic silver medalists for Azerbaijan
Athletes (track and field) at the 2016 Summer Paralympics
Medalists at the 2016 Summer Paralympics
1991 births
European Games competitors for Azerbaijan
Athletes (track and field) at the 2015 European Games
Paralympic medalists in athletics (track and field)
Azerbaijani javelin throwers